Melody of My Heart is a 1936 British musical film directed by Wilfred Noy and starring Derek Oldham, Lorraine La Fosse and Bruce Seton. It was made at Beaconsfield Studios.

Partial cast
 Derek Oldham as Joe Montfort 
 Lorraine La Fosse as Carmel 
 Bruce Seton as Jim Brent 
 Hughes Macklin as Mr. Smith 
 Dorothy Vernon as Mrs. Dearwell 
 MacArthur Gordon as Manager 
 Colin Cunningham as Ramenado 
 Joe Velitch as Pastias 
 Joyce St. Clair as Mercedes

References

Bibliography
 Low, Rachael. Filmmaking in 1930s Britain. George Allen & Unwin, 1985.
 Wood, Linda. British Films, 1927-1939. British Film Institute, 1986.

External links

1936 films
British musical films
British black-and-white films
1936 musical films
Films directed by Wilfred Noy
Films shot at Beaconsfield Studios
1930s English-language films
1930s British films